Myelobia squamata is a moth in the family Crambidae. It is found in Peru. It is nocturnal.

References

Moths described in 1919
Chiloini